The Heritage Council is an organisation created by the Irish government to "engage, educate and advocate to develop a wider understanding of the vital contribution that our heritage makes to our social, environmental and economic well-being."

The Heritage Council was established under the Heritage Act 1995. Its current CEO is Virginia Teehan.

The Council's purview includes monuments, archaeological objects, heritage objects such as art and industrial works, documents and genealogical records, architectural heritage, flora, fauna, wildlife habitats, landscapes, seascapes, wrecks, geology, heritage gardens, parks and inland waterways.

The Heritage Council organizes the annual Heritage Week in Ireland. It also has a grants scheme.

In 2005, the Heritage Council formed the Irish Walled Towns Network (IWTN). The role of the IWTN is to help the walled towns of Ireland become better places in which to live, work and visit. The network does this through providing grants for medieval town wall repairs, secondly, by providing grants for community festivals and heritage interpretation, thirdly, training community groups on how best to use their place's heritage and finally, by coordinating research and publishing advisory documents. In 2013, the IWTN's education programme won the European Union Prize for Cultural Heritage/Europa Nostra Award.

The Heritage Council established the Museums Standards Programme for Ireland (MSPI) in 2007, to benchmark and promote professional standards in the care of collections and to recognise through accreditation the achievement of those standards within the Irish museum sector. As of 2020, 43 museums have been fully accredited through the MSPI programme.

See also
 An Taisce
 National Trust, in Northern Ireland
 The Discovery Programme

References

External links 
The Heritage Council website

Organizations established in 1995
Ireland
Irish culture
Cultural organisations based in the Republic of Ireland
Tourism in Ireland
Cultural heritage of Ireland
Department of Housing, Local Government and Heritage